These are the results of the women's singles competition in badminton at the 2004 Summer Olympics in Athens.

Medalists

Draw

Bronze-medal match

References
 tournamentsoftware.com

Badminton at the 2004 Summer Olympics
Olymp
Women's events at the 2004 Summer Olympics